Gyeongjong of Joseon (20 November 1688 – 11 October 1724; reigned 1720–1724) was the 20th king of the Joseon dynasty of Korea. He was the son of King Sukjong and his concubine, Royal Noble Consort Hui of the Indong Jang clan.

Biography
In 1690, Gyeongjong's designation as heir to the throne precipitated a struggle between the Noron faction, which supported his half-brother Prince Yeoning, and the Soron faction, which supported Gyeongjong of Joseon. Due to this struggle, Soron scholars were kept out of power and factional strife reached a high point during Gyeongjong's reign.

Following the death of King Sukjong in 1720, Crown Prince Hwiso (Yi Yun, 이윤 왕세자) ascended the throne at age 31 as King Gyeongjong. When Sukjong died in 1720, he supposedly told Yi Yi-myoung to name Yeoning-geum as Gyeongjong's heir, but suspicions arose between Soron, Noron enemies, from the absence of a historiographer or recorder.

Gyeongjong suffered from ill health during his reign, and the Noron political faction pressured Gyeongjong to step down in favor of his half-brother, Prince Yeoning. In 1720, two months after his enthronement, his half brother, Prince Yeoning (the future King Yeongjo) was installed as Crown Prince (wangseje, 왕세제, 王世弟) to handle state affairs, since the king's weak health made impossible for him to manage politics.

It is said that, Gyeongjong's mother, Lady Jang, was to blame for his illnesses. She was sentenced to death by poison, in 1701. Following the ruling, Lady Jang begged to see her son, the Crown Prince (later Gyeongjong). As she dashed towards him to greet him, she inflicted a severe injury to the Crown Prince's lower abdomen that left him sterile and unable to produce an heir. Owing to King Gyeongjong's fragile health, he had no energy or time to do anything significant in the four years of his reign.

This aggravated the power struggle and led to a big massacre, namely the Shinimsahwa (辛壬士禍). The Norons sent memorials to the king to no effect while the Sorons used this to their advantage—claiming the Noron faction were trying to usurp power and subsequently getting their rival faction removed from several offices. Members of the Soron faction then came up with an idea to assassinate the heir (Yeoning-geum) under the cover of hunting for a white fox said to be haunting the palace, but Queen dowager Inwon protected him and he was able to keep living, after this he said to the king he rather would go and live as a commoner.

During his four years reign, there were two major incidents of massacre; one is Sinchuk-oksa in which the ruling political party, Soron, swept the opposition Noron, a group that insisted that Gyeongjong's half-brother, Prince Yeoning, handle national affairs on behalf of the weak and ailing king during the first year of Gyeongjongreign 1720 and the other one is Imin-oksa which took place in the 2nd year of his reign, circa 1722. History calls both incidents as Sinim-sahwa. During his reign, he made small guns in imitation of the western weapons and reformed the land measurement system in the southern parts of the country.

King Gyeongjong died in 1724 and was entombed in the Cheonjangsan Mountain of Yangju. The title of the tomb was granted as the Uireung.

There was some speculation from Soron party members that his half-brother, Prince Yeoning, had something to do with his death due to the earlier attempt by the Noron faction to have him replace Gyeongjong on the throne, but several historiographers now conclude that he could have died of eating spoiled seafood, as described in Homer's book, The History of Korea. “But we may well doubt the truth of the rumour, for nothing that is told of that brother indicates that he would commit such an act, and in the second place a man who will eat shrimps in mid-summer, that have been brought thirty miles from the sea without ice might expect to die.”

After his death, the chronicles of Gyeongjong's rule were published in 1732 under the reign of Yeongjo's reign. A few of Gyeongjong's youthful calligraphic works have also survived:

Family
Father: King Sukjong of Joseon (7 October 1661 – 12 July 1720) (조선 숙종)
Grandfather: King Hyeonjong of Joseon (14 March 1641 – 17 September 1674) (조선 현종)
Grandmother: Queen Myeongseong of the Cheongpung Kim clan (13 June 1642 – 21 January 1684) (명성왕후 김씨)
Mother: Royal Noble Consort Hui of the Indong Jang clan (3 November 1659 – 9 November 1701) (희빈 장씨)
Grandfather: Jang Hyeong (25 February 1623 – 12 January 1669) (장형)
Grandmother: Lady Yun of the Papyeong Yun clan (1626 – 1698) (파평 윤씨)
Consorts and their Respective Issue(s):
Queen Danui of the Cheongsong Shim clan (11 July 1686 – 8 March 1718) (단의왕후 심씨) - No issue
Queen Seonui of the Hamjong Eo clan (14 December 1705 – 12 August 1730) (선의왕후 어씨) - No issue

In popular culture
 Portrayed by Kim Sung Hwan in the 1988 MBC TV series 500 Years of Joseon:Queen In Hyun.
Portrayed by Lee Seung-hyung and Kwak Jung-wook in the 2002 KBS TV series Jang Hee Bin.
Portrayed by Yoon Chan in the 2010 MBC TV series Dong Yi.
 Portrayed by Hyun Woo in the 2016 SBS TV series Jackpot.
Portrayed by Han Seung-hyun in the 2019 SBS TV series Haechi.

See also
List of Korean monarchs
Joseon Dynasty
Joseon Dynasty politics
Dong Yi (TV series)

References

1688 births
1724 deaths
18th-century Korean monarchs